Agonotrechus is a genus of ground beetles in the family Carabidae. There are more than 25 described species in Agonotrechus.

Species
These 27 species belong to the genus Agonotrechus:

 Agonotrechus amplicollis Ueno, 1999
 Agonotrechus andrewesi Jeannel, 1923
 Agonotrechus apterus (Belousov & Kabak, 2003)
 Agonotrechus birmanicus (Bates, 1892)
 Agonotrechus campanulatus Ueno, 1999
 Agonotrechus dubius Belousov & Kabak, 2003
 Agonotrechus farkaci (Deuve, 1995)
 Agonotrechus fugongensis Deuve & Liang, 2016
 Agonotrechus horni Jedlicka, 1932
 Agonotrechus iris Andrewes, 1935
 Agonotrechus laticollis (Ueno & Yu, 1997)
 Agonotrechus lunanshanus Belousov & Kabak, 2003
 Agonotrechus nomurai Ueno, 1999
 Agonotrechus paradoxus (Ueno, 1981)
 Agonotrechus reflexicollis (Ueno, 1977)
 Agonotrechus sichuanicola (Deuve, 1989)
 Agonotrechus sinicola Deuve, 1989
 Agonotrechus sinotroglophilus Deuve, 2000
 Agonotrechus spinangulus Belousov & Kabak&Liang, 2019
 Agonotrechus tenuicollis Ueno, 1986
 Agonotrechus tonkinensis Jedlicka, 1939
 Agonotrechus trechoides Belousov & Kabak, 2003
 Agonotrechus ventrosior (Deuve, 1995)
 Agonotrechus vina Ueno, 1999
 Agonotrechus wuyipeng Deuve, 1992
 Agonotrechus xiaoheishan Deuve & Kavanaugh, 2016
 Agonotrechus yunnanus Ueno, 1999

References

Trechinae